Nunez is a city in Emanuel County, Georgia, United States. The population was 147 at the 2010 census.

History
The Georgia General Assembly incorporated Nunez as a town in 1903. The city was named after Samuel Nunez, a pioneer Jew in Georgia history.

Geography

Nunez is located in southern Emanuel County at  (32.491880, -82.346547). Georgia State Route 297 passes through the city, leading north  to Swainsboro, the county seat, and south  to Interstate 16 Exit 84.

Demographics

As of the census of 2000, there were 131 people, 50 households, and 36 families residing in the town. The racial makeup of the town was 69.47% White, 23.66% African American, 0.76% Asian, 6.11% from other races. Hispanic or Latino of any race were 6.11% of the population.

There were 50 households, out of which 30.0% had children under the age of 18 living with them, 56.0% were married couples living together, 14.0% had a female householder with no husband present, and 28.0% were non-families. 26.0% of all households were made up of individuals, and 10.0% had someone living alone who was 65 years of age or older. The average household size was 2.62 and the average family size was 3.22.

In the town the population was spread out, with 23.7% under the age of 18, 13.0% from 18 to 24, 22.9% from 25 to 44, 24.4% from 45 to 64, and 16.0% who were 65 years of age or older. The median age was 38 years. For every 100 females, there were 79.5 males. For every 100 females age 18 and over, there were 72.4 males.

The median income for a household in the town was $27,500, and the median income for a family was $33,250. Males had a median income of $25,000 versus $26,406 for females. The per capita income for the town was $12,491. There were 11.8% of families and 17.1% of the population living below the poverty line, including 28.9% of under eighteens and 11.8% of those over 64.

References

Cities in Emanuel County, Georgia
Cities in Georgia (U.S. state)